Bridge Creek Wilderness is a wilderness area located in the Ochoco Mountains of central Oregon, within the Ochoco National Forest.  It was established in 1984 and comprises , making it one of the smallest Wilderness areas in the state.

Topography
Bridge Creek Wilderness is characterized by steep terrain, open meadows, forested mountain slopes, and barren plateaus. Bridge Creek drains northeasterly from the summit of the Ochoco Mountains, essentially dividing the Wilderness into two plateaus. Five perennial springs flow in the Wilderness - Thompson, Pisgah, Masterson, Nelson, and Maxwell. The Bridge Spring and Bridge Creek watershed creates the domestic water supply for the town of Mitchell.

Lava vents located north of the John Day River produced lava that now caps most of the Ochoco crest, creating the pillar-shaped basalt columns at the cliffs on North Point.

Vegetation

The forest in Bridge Creek Wilderness consists primarily of Douglas fir, grand fir, and larch, with some stands of lodgepole and ponderosa pine.  Other plants include sagebrush, bunchgrass, sparse, and mountain mahogany.

Wildlife
A variety of wildlife lives in Bridge Creek Wilderness, including elk, deer, mule deer, black bear, and mountain lion.  Birds include pileated woodpecker, goshawk and prairie falcon.

Recreation
Popular recreational activities in Bridge Creek Wilderness include hiking several miles of trails to North Point and East Point.

See also
 List of Oregon Wildernesses
 List of U.S. Wilderness Areas
 Wilderness Act

References

External links
 Deschutes & Ochoco National Forests - Bridge Creek Wilderness

IUCN Category Ib
Protected areas of Wheeler County, Oregon
Wilderness areas of Oregon
Ochoco National Forest
1984 establishments in Oregon
Protected areas established in 1984